Cardamine digitata (Richardson's bittercress; syn.  Dentaria digitata Lam.), is an ornamental plant species in the family Brassicaceae, which is native of Alaska and Canada.

References

External links
USDA: Cardamine digitata

digitata
Flora of Alaska
Flora of Canada
Flora without expected TNC conservation status